Clément Lippacher (1850–1934) was a French composer and organist.

Life 
Born in Haguenau, a student of Édouard Ignace Andlauer in Alsace, then at the École Niedermeyer of Paris, he won a second organ prize in 1868, a first runner-up prize in plainsong in 1869, a second harmony prize in 1870.

He became an organist at the Église Saint-Eugène-Sainte-Cécile in Paris.

Selected works 
 1882: Les Papillons, 2-act ballet by Holtzer, music by Raoul Pugno and Clément Lippacher.
 1883: la Vente de M. X...
 1886: Viviane, ballet-féerie in five acts and six scenes, by Edmond Gondinet, music by Raoul Pugno and Clément Lippacher, premiered on 28 October 1886 at the Eden-Théâtre.
 1886: La Pension de Me Laicque, with Mengal
 1886: Joséphine vendue par ses sœurs, 3-act opéra bouffe by Paul Ferrier and Fabrice Carré, music by Victor Roger premiered in Paris, Théâtre des Bouffes-Parisiens, 20 March.
 1892: Le Christ, sacred drama, libretto by Charles Grandmougin, stage music by Lippacher.
 1892: Noël d'Alsace, libretto by Charles Grandmougin, stage music by Clément Lippacher.

Notes and references

Notes

References

Sources 
.

External links 

1850 births
1934 deaths
People from Haguenau
French classical organists
French male organists
French Romantic composers
19th-century organists
20th-century organists
20th-century French male musicians
19th-century French male musicians
Male classical organists